Peltigera lepidophora, commonly known as the scaly pelt, is a species of foliose lichen in the family Peltigeraceae. It was first described by Finnish lichenologist Edvard August Vainio in 1878 as a variety of Peltigera canina. German botanist Friedrich August Georg Bitter promoted it to species status in 1904.

The upper surface is covered with isidia, while the lower surface has pale, indistinct veins and unbranched rhizines. It grows on exposed soil, such as roadsides or trailbanks.

References

lepidophora
Lichen species
Lichens of Europe
Lichens described in 1878
Taxa named by Edvard August Vainio